Fuller Park may refer to a place in the United States:

Fuller Park, Chicago, Illinois, a community area
Fuller Park (Chicago park), a park within the community area
T. O. Fuller State Park, Memphis, Tennessee